John MacBride (sometimes written John McBride; ; 7 May 1868 – 5 May 1916) was an Irish republican and military leader. He was executed by the British government for his participation in the 1916 Easter Rising in Dublin.

Early life
John MacBride was born at The Quay, Westport, County Mayo, Ireland, to Patrick MacBride, a shopkeeper and trader, and the former Honoria Gill, who survived her son. A plaque marks the building on the Westport Quays where he was born (now the Helm Bar and Restaurant). He was educated at the Christian Brothers' School, Westport, and at St. Malachy's College, Belfast. His red hair and long nose led to him being given the nickname "Foxy Jack". He worked for a period in a drapery shop in Castlerea, County Roscommon. He had studied medicine, but gave it up and began working with a chemist's firm in Dublin.

He joined the Irish Republican Brotherhood and was associated with Michael Cusack in the early days of the Gaelic Athletic Association. He also joined the Celtic Literary Society through which he came to know Arthur Griffith who was to remain a friend and influence throughout his life. Beginning in 1893, MacBride was termed a "dangerous nationalist" by the British government. In 1896 he went to the United States on behalf of the IRB. In the same year he returned and emigrated to South Africa.

Participation in the Second Anglo-Boer War
MacBride took part in the Second Boer War on the Boer side, for whom he raised the Irish Transvaal Brigade. What became known as MacBride's Brigade was first commanded by an Irish-American, Colonel John Blake, an ex-US Cavalry Officer. MacBride recommended Blake as Commander, since MacBride himself had no military experience. The Brigade was given official recognition by the Boer government, and the commissions of the Brigade's officers were signed by State Secretary F.W. Reitz. MacBride was commissioned with the rank of Major in the Boer army and given Boer citizenship.

The 500 Irish and Irish-Americans fought the British. Often these Irish commandos were fighting opposite Irish regiments, such as the Royal Dublin Fusiliers and the Royal Inniskilling Fusiliers. From the hills around the besieged town of Ladysmith to the plains of the Orange Free State, MacBride's Brigade first looked after the Boers' "Long Tom" gun, then fought in the Battle of Colenso and later held the rearguard, harassing Lord Roberts' cavalry as the Boer army retreated.

A Second Irish Brigade was organised by Arthur Lynch. The arrival in the Irish camp of an Irish-American ambulance corps bolstered MacBride's Brigade. Michael Davitt, who had resigned as an M.P, visited MacBride's Brigade. When Col. Blake was injured at Ladysmith, MacBride had to take sole command of the Brigade. Though Blake later returned for a short period, he later left the Brigade to join another commando. In Ireland pro-Boer feeling, informed by Arthur Griffith and Maud Gonne, formed the most popular and most fervent of the European pro-Boer movements. However, more than 16,000 Irish fought for the British against the Boers.

Marriage to Maud Gonne
When MacBride became a citizen of the Transvaal, the British considered that, as an Irishman and a British subject 
of the United Kingdom of Great Britain and Ireland, he had given aid to the enemy. After the war he travelled to Paris where Maud Gonne lived. In 1903, he married her to the disapproval of many, including W. B. Yeats, who considered her his muse and had previously proposed to her.

Patrick J. Little, editor of 'New Ireland', who had published work by both Yeats and Gonne, recalled an extreme case that almost prevented the marriage:

The following year their son Seán MacBride was born. Yeats wrote to Lady Gregory in January 1905, the month MacBride and Maud separated, that he had been told MacBride had molested his stepdaughter, Iseult, who was 10 at that time. The marriage had already failed but the couple could not agree on custody of Sean. Maud instituted divorce proceedings in Paris. No divorce was given but in a separation agreement, Maud won custody to the baby until age 12. The father got visiting rights and one month each summer. MacBride returned to Dublin and never saw his son again.
Anthony J. Jordan argues that MacBride was a much-maligned man in the divorce proceedings. He posits that on the merit of W. B. Yeats believing Maud Gonne's accusations against her husband, successive biographers of Yeats have treated them as factual, ignoring the verdict of the Parisian Divorce Court which found MacBride innocent. Dr. Caoimhe Nic Dhaibhid writes that "The target of Jordan's argument has been a number of biographies of W. B. Yeats, particularly Roy Foster's landmark 1997". She appears to endorse Jordan's position. Donal Fallon, MacBride's recent biographer, quotes the poet Paul Durcan, the grandson of Joseph MacBride and Eileen Wilson, as believing that MacBride "was unquestionably defamed" and lays much of the blame on the "people in the Yeats-Maud Gonne Industry".

About forty years after the marriage had ended, Maud herself attributed the breakdown of the marriage to John's loneliness and a drink problem in Paris, during her frequent trips to Ireland without him.

1916 Easter Rising
After returning permanently from Paris to Dublin in 1905 MacBride joined other Irish nationalists in preparing for an insurrection. Because he was so well known to the British, the leaders thought it wise to keep him outside their secret military group planning a Rising. As a result he happened to find himself in the midst of the Rising without notice. He was in Dublin early on Easter Monday morning to meet his brother Dr. Anthony MacBride, who was arriving from Westport to be married on the Wednesday. The Major walked up Grafton St and saw Thomas MacDonagh in uniform and leading his troops. He offered his services and was appointed second-in-command at the Jacob's factory.

After the Rising, MacBride was court-martialed under the Defence of the Realm Act and executed by firing squad in Dublin's Kilmainham Gaol on 5 May 1916. Facing the British firing squad, he said he did not wish to be blindfolded, adding "I have looked down the muzzles of too many guns in the South African war to fear death and now please carry out your sentence". He is buried in Dublin's Arbour Hill Prison.

Yeats, who was jealous of MacBride for marrying Maud Gonne (and later proposed to her daughter Iseult) gave MacBride an ambivalent eulogy in his poem "Easter, 1916":

Maud Gonne wrote to Yeats, "No I dont like your poem, it isn't worthy of you & above all it isn't worthy of its subject... As for my husband he has entered eternity by the great door of sacrifice… so that praying for him I can also ask for his prayers".

Legacy

In November 2016 Ciarán MacSuibhne, a member of the local St Patrick’s Drama Group wrote an amateur, three-act play detailing various stages in MacBride's life including his experiences in the Second Boer War, his marriage to and separation from Maud Gonne and the concern regarding the future of their only child, Seán, which followed. The play, which featured the poetry of Yeats, also covers the period following MacBride's execution. The opening and closing scenes of the play, in particular, were described as "very moving". The character of Maud Gonne's half-sister, Eileen Wilson was played by Wilson's great-granddaughter, Bernardine Walsh MacBride. The play, which was shown in the Westport Town Hall Theatre, was described by the Mayo News as "a fitting tribute by a local drama group to a local hero".

Notes

Bibliography
 Boylan, Henry, A Dictionary of Irish Biography Dublin, Gill & Macmillan 1999
 Fallon, Donal, John MacBride, Dublin, O'Brien Press, 2015
 Jordan, Anthony J. ' Major John MacBride' , Westport Historical Society 1991
 Jordan anthony J. ' Willie Yeats & the Gonne MacBrides' , Westport Historical Society 1997.
 Jordan Anthony J. ' The Yeats/Gonne/MacBride Triangle' ,  Westport Books 2000.
 Jordan Anthony J. ' Boer War to Easter Rising; the Writings of Major John MacBride' Westport Books 2006.
 McCracken, Donal P. 'MacBride's Brigade: Irish commandos in the Anglo-Boer war', Four Courts Press, Dublin 1999, 208pp, ISBN 1-85182-499-5.
 O'Malley, Ernie, On Another Man's Wound published 1937
 Purdon, Edward, The 1916 Rising Mercier Press Ltd 1999

External links
 "John MacBride (1865-1916)", Ricorso

1865 births
1916 deaths
Executed participants in the Easter Rising
Irish soldiers
John
Military personnel from County Mayo
Members of the Irish Republican Brotherhood
People educated at St Malachy's College
South African Republic military personnel of the Second Boer War
People from Westport, County Mayo